Dyuni (Дюни, "Dunes"; also Duni or Dyunite) is a holiday town and seaside resort on the Bulgarian Black Sea Coast, 40 km south of the Bulgarian city of Burgas and 7 km from Sozopol. The construction of the resort began in 1987 by an Austrian company and after a Bulgarian project.

The resort has a length of 4–5 km and a width of over 100 m, with a beach suitable for windsurfing and other water sports in a wide bay. Dyuni Royal Resort has ten tennis courts (3 hard with tartan surface and 7 with artificial grass with quartz sand) and a number of swimming pools.

References

Seaside resorts in Bulgaria